Jindřich Baumruk (23 September 1881 – 5 May 1964) was a Czech footballer who played as a forward.

Club career 
Jindřich started his career at Slavia Prague in 1896, at just 15. His first recorded game was in 1897 as Slavia Prague took on their "B" side at beat them 3–1, to win the Czech Crown. On 6 October 1901 Jindřich scored 2 in a 4-3 win over English side Civil Service F.C., one of his goals came through dribbling through several defenders and placing it past the keeper By 1902 Jindřich had 71 goals for Slavia Prague, also this year he netted a hattrick against Magyar Uszo Egyesulet , in a 8-1 victory. In 1904, Jindřich, Jan Košek and Rudolf Krummer headed to Sparta Prague for a year. In 1906, he scored 2 in a 3–3 draw against Scottish champions Celtic. In his last year, 1910, Baumruk won the Charity Cup.

Personal life 
Baumruk is a sibling-in-law to former teammate Jan Košek, due to Jan marrying Baumruk's sister. Also Baumruk's nephew is Jan Košek being his sister's son. Jindřich Baumruk, still in his seventies, remembered the beginnings of football in Prague, "On Vinohradská Kanálka, a flat plot in the place of today's Riegrový Sady, where students from both Vinohrady secondary schools - from the gymnasium in Hálková street and from the Na Smetánce school used to gather to play football.

References 

1881 births
1964 deaths
People from Rakovník
Sportspeople from the Central Bohemian Region
Czech footballers